Mount Xinkang is a mountain in Taiwan with an elevation of .

See also
List of mountains in Taiwan

References

Landforms of Hualien County 
Xinkang